Lai Xiaoxiao (born December 3, 1993), also known as Sunny Lai, is a professional wushu taolu athlete from Anhui, China.

Early life and education 
Lai was born in Guangde, Anhui Province in December, 1993. At the age of seven, she was sent to Zhenlong Primary School in Guangde County to practice wushu and later joined the Anhui provincial wushu team on December 1, 2003. She was transferred to the Anhui Provincial Sports School as well. After graduating from the Provincial Sports School, Lai enrolled in East China University of Science and Technology and graduated with a bachelor's degree in 2017. In 2019, she enrolled in Anhui Normal University to pursue a master's degree in sports education.

Career 
Lai made her international debut at the 2015 World Wushu Championships in Jakarta, Indonesia, where she became the world champion in women's qiangshu. She also won a gold medal in qiangshu at the 2016 Taolu World Cup in Fuzhou, China. The following year, she competed in the 2017 National Games of China and won the silver medal in women's changquan all-around. In the 2021 National Games of China, Lai became the women's changquan all-around champion. At the 2022 World Games, Lai won the gold medal in women's changquan.

Competitive history

See also 
 China national wushu team

References

External links 

 Official website
 Lai Xiaoxiao on Instagram

1993 births
Living people
Chinese wushu practitioners
Sportspeople from Anhui
East China University of Technology alumni
Anhui Normal University alumni
Competitors at the 2022 World Games
World Games gold medalists
World Games medalists in wushu